A bamboo wife is a bolster (pillow) made from a woven bamboo cylinder that may be as large as the size of the human body. It goes by names such as (Vietnamese: trúc phu nhân;), also known as a Dutch wife, in Tagalog as kawil (fish hook or chain); in Burmese as ဖက်လုံး (hpaat lone) and in Indonesian as guling. 

Bamboo wives are typically hand-woven from thinly-cut bamboo cane.

Etymology

English  

The origin of the English term "Dutch wife" is thought, via folk etymology, to be from the (former) Dutch colony of Indonesia, where Dutch traders would spend long periods away from their wives. A more likely explanation is the link with Dutch courage, Dutch auction or to go Dutch. Here, the use of the word Dutch was used to describe something that is irregular. This carried over to America and other colonies. Expressions like this are still applied in other circumstances such as in the phrase, "You can trust me or I am a Dutchman."

Middle English Duch, from Middle Dutch duutsch; akin to Old High German diutisc German, Old English thēod nation, Goth thiudisko as a gentile, thiuda people, Oscan touto city.

Mandarin Chinese  

Besides the term "Bamboo wife" (竹夫人, zhúfūrén) these pillows are known in Mandarin Chinese under a variety of names, namely Zhú jiā xī (竹夹膝), zhú jī (竹姬), qīng nú (青奴), zhú nú (竹奴), and zhú fēi (竹妃).

Shape and size 

Bamboo wives come in a variety of sizes. They are typically similar in shape to orthopedic body pillows, and can be curved or a long, cylindrical shape.

Usage 
In the summer heat, the open bamboo structure is cooler to the touch than fabric pillows or sheets. A user embraces the Dutch wife as they would hold a sleeping companion, with the goal of exposing the body to a greater flow of air. The device may also alleviate lower back pain when placed between the knees during sleep.

History 
Bamboo wives and their variants in other countries originated East Asia and Southeast Asia. They were designed to cool the body in times of high temperature and humidity. They can also be made of cotton or other synthetic fibers. Dutch wives made of cotton or other synthetic fiber are widely used in Indonesia. 

Bamboo wives have decreased in popularity, possibly due to the prevalence of air conditioning, especially in urban areas. Another reason for the decline may be poor quality. They remain popular in Korea, but are outweighed by indoor cooling and bolsters made from synthetic materials.

As of 2019, bamboo wives were not typically sold at corner stores, tourist shops, or night markets in Japan, Korea or the Philippines. They are mostly found in non-English online shops.

Japan 

In Japan, the Dakimakura are sometimes euphemistically referred to as "chikufujin" (Bamboo wives). This is because while the bamboo wife is no longer used in most East Asian and Southeast Asian homes, the idea of a bolster for hugging while you sleep has endured and the Dakimakura can be viewed its spiritual successor.

Korea 

The first mention of the jukbuin in Korea dates to the 13th century during the late Goryeo period. Jukbuin were typically held when sleeping on the wooden floors of a Hanok as beds were not commonly used. Generally speaking, family members did not each have a personal jukbuin. However, a son would never use his father's jukbuin in order to show him respect.

Every year the Damyang Bamboo Festival is held in Damyang County, South Jeolla Province, South Korea which showcases local products made from bamboo, including an array of jukbuin.

Jukbuin for infants arrived after the adult versions. Other jukbuin variations include an electric fan.

Culture

Films  

Because chikufujin are hand-woven from cheap materials, they are sometimes used in media to connote the poverty of their creators. In the Japanese film Lady Snowblood, a supporting character (Kobue) pretends to make her living by weaving chikufujin to conceal her profession as a prostitute from her father.

Riddles 

Certain Chinese numismatic charms reference bamboo wives in the form of a riddle that reads, "Empty eye without eyeball. The couple live together without love. In autumn the wife leaves. When the lotus blooms again she returns," the answer to which is the bamboo wife.

Notes

References  
 

Wife
Furniture
Pillows